The European Cricket Championship was a group of various tournaments in which national cricket sides throughout Europe competed. The competition was designed to encourage and develop the best players in countries where cricket was not a major sport and Europe's only Test cricket playing country at the time, England did not enter a full-strength side. The games were often played as 50-over one-day cricket matches, most of these without One Day International status, but more recently has been played in a Twenty20 format (see below for more details).

History

The European Cricket Championships began in 1996 as a competition for seven European associate teams and an (English cricket Board) ECB XI. The second installment, two years later, saw the two new associate members, France and Germany join them and the competition played over two divisions.

In 2000, places were given to the top finishers of the European Affiliates Championship and this continued over the following installments. Promotion and relegation between divisions was not introduced until 2004.

With the introduction of the ICC World Cricket League in 2006, the championship was revamped. The European Affiliates Championship was incorporated into the European Cricket Championships with the teams being split between Divisions Two, Three and Four according to the placement in the final competition. Additionally, the ECB XI was no longer included and only full national sides could take part. A fifth league was introduced in 2009–10 season containing some of the newest affiliate members of the European Cricket Council, but discontinued thereafter, along with Division 4. With the end of the World Cricket League in 2017, the European 50-over divisional structure was abolished altogether.

Participating teams
Legend
 – Champions
 – Runners-up
 – Third place
 – Semi-finalist (no third-place playoff)
* – Team was ineligible for tournament
 — Hosts

Tournaments

2006-07 European Cricket Championship
From 2006, the European Cricket Council expanded the tournament to include five divisions of between 4 and 8 teams. By 2009, all five divisions contained six teams.

Division One 
The European Division One Championships was held from 4–9 August in Scotland.  Five teams participated in a round robin tournament, the games being held in Glasgow and Ayr.  The games between Scotland, Ireland and the Netherlands had full ODI status. The tournament was won by Ireland, who had also won a 'clean sweep' of European Championship at all age levels.

The top three teams qualified for 2007 WCL Division One, the 4th place for 2007 WCL Division Two and the 5th place for 2007 WCL Division Three.

Division Two 
The European Division Two Championships was held from 4–9 August in Scotland, together with Division One. The winner would be promoted to the next installment of Division One in 2008.

Division Two was primarily played in Glasgow, with one game being played at RAF Lossiemouth for security reasons. Italy were absent, having been promoted to Division One. Greece made their return to Division Two after a six-year absence, whilst the tournament saw the international debuts of Guernsey and Jersey. It was won by Norway, who were promoted to 2008 Division One. The win also granted them entry into 2008 WCL Division Five alongside runners-up Jersey and 3rd place Germany. Greece came in last place and were relegated to 2007 Division Three after being stripped of their first round points due to fielding ineligible players. The tournament was met by protests due to the involvement of the Israeli team.

Group A 

Greece was disqualified for ineligibility of players.

Group B

Division Four 
This tournament was played in Belgium, and featured the debut of Cyprus who played Finland, Luxembourg and Slovenia. It was won by Finland who gained promotion to 2007 Division Three, as did runners-up Cyprus.

2007

Division Three

Group A

Group B

In the semi-finals Croatia beat Malta by nine wickets and Spain beat the Isle of Man on fewer wickets lost when scores were tied. In the final Croatia beat Spain by four runs. In the 5th–8th place play-offs, Belgium and Portugal were victorious meaning that Cyprus and Finland would be relegated to 2009 Division Three.

Play off
On 18 November 2007 a play-off between Croatia and Israel took place in Tel Aviv, Croatia won the match by five runs to win promotion to Division Two.

2008-09 European Cricket Championship

Division One 
The European Championship Division 1 was held from 25 to 31 July in Ireland. Six teams participated in a round robin tournament, the games being played in Dublin. The tournament was won by Ireland.

Division Two 
The European Championship Division 2 was held from 18 to 23 August in Guernsey. Six teams participated in a round robin tournament, the games being played at the King George V, Port Soif and College Field grounds. The tournament was won by Jersey who will compete in a play off later in the year for a chance of promotion to Division One. By finishing in 2nd and 3rd place, Guernsey and Gibraltar also secured themselves a place in 2009 WCL Division Seven.

2009

Division Three

The 2009 European Championship Division Three was held in La Manga, Spain from 31 August to 5 September. Israel finished top and gained promotion to 2010 Division Two after beating Croatia in a play-off. Malta were relegated to 2011 Division Four.

Division Four

The 2009 European Championship Division Four was held in Limassol, Cyprus from 14 to 19 September. The winners were Cyprus on net run rate as both Switzerland and Austria, who had returned to the competition after a number of years absence, had equal points at the end of the competition. Slovenia were relegated to 2011 Division Five after losing all of their games.

Division Five

The 2009 European Championship Division Five was held in Corfu, Greece from 7 to 12 September. Greece finished top gaining promotion to Division 4. The tournament also marked Turkey's debut in international cricket. Although they finished last they did gain their first victory in international cricket over Bulgaria.

2010

Division One

The 2010 European Championship Division One was held in Jersey from 13 to 19 July. The ECC decided that the division would be made up of the six highest placed European teams currently embedded in the World Cricket League structure. The three nations with ODI status sent their second XIs to the tournament. Hosts Jersey were the champions, winning all their games.

Division Two

The 2010 European Championship Division Two was held in Guernsey from 13 to 19 July. The ECC decided that the division would be made up of the three lowest placed teams currently embedded in the World Cricket League structure and the three next placed teams based on recent regional events. The highest placed of these latter teams at the end of the tournament would gain qualification for 2010 WCL Division Eight. Guernsey were the champions after winning all the games and Germany qualified for the Division Eight tournament. Although their net run rate was lower than that of France they earned qualification as they had won their match against the French side. Norway finished above Israel for the same reason.

Champions

Division One

Division Two

Division Three

Division Four

Division Five

See also

European Affiliates Championship
European Cricket Council

References

 
Cricket
International cricket competitions
Cricket competitions in Europe